Sosefo Hega Panuve (born 10 November 1987) is a Wallisian athlete who has represented Wallis and Futuna at the Pacific Games, Pacific Mini Games, and Arafura Games.

At the 2007 Pacific Games in Apia he won gold in the javelin. At the 2007 Arafura Games he won gold in the javelin and silver in the shot put. At the 2009 Pacific Mini Games in Rarotonga he won bronze in the javelin.

At the 2011 Pacific Games in Nouméa he won bronze in the javelin.

References

Living people
1987 births
Wallis and Futuna javelin throwers
Wallis and Futuna shot putters